Volt Greece is a social liberal political party in Greece and the Greek branch of Volt Europa.

History 
Volt Greece was founded in 2018. In July 2022, the group elected its first executive secretariat and an ethics committee, which were tasked with preparing its establishment as a party. On 4 October 2022, the party was officially registered, becoming the 18th registered party of Volt Europa.

In December 2022, Volt founded the new political alliance Prasino+Mov (Greek ΠΡΑΣΙΝΟ & ΜΩΒ / English Green & Purple) together with the parties Ikologi Prasini, Pirate Party of Greece, Greens – Solidarity, Greek Party for the Animals and the ecofeminist movement Kyklos.

On 11 and 12 March, the party held its first founding congress in Athens and elected Nikolas Fournarakis and Theodora Fabricezi as co-presidents.

Policies

European reform 
The party aims to create a European federation.

Volt wants to strengthen the European Parliament, a President elected by the European citizens and a unified European government led by a Prime Minister, with joint finance and economy ministries and a European army.

Economy 
The party wants to modernise the Greek economy and aims to create more high value-added jobs. The aim is to increase productivity and reduce the unemployment rate to below 5%. In addition, a universal basic income is to be gradually introduced to reduce poverty and a decentralised universal health care system is to be created for all inhabitants of the country. The role of the European Central Bank is to be expanded to include the fight against unemployment.

Education 
Volt aims to strengthen the autonomy of school institutions administratively, financially, pedagogically and academically.

The administrative structure of the Ministry of Education is to be decentralised and its central and regional departments subjected to performance evaluation.

Environmental and climate protection 
The party aims at green growth in combination with energy transition, the protection of biodiversity and sustainable environmental management.

Immigration and asylum policy 
The party advocates a controlled admission of migrants and refugees and their integration, as a means of countering the demographic problem of Greece.

Organisation

Party Executive 
The party is chaired by Nikolas Fournarakis and Theodora Fabricezi. In addition, there is a 9-member Executive Secretariat, which is responsible for implementation and administration in accordance with the decisions of the party's General Assembly.

Ethics Council 
The five-member Ethics Board monitors compliance with the Rules of Procedure, the Code of Conduct, the decisions of the Plenary Assembly and the decisions of the Executive Secretariat and the Board of Directors.

Finances 
The party is financed by membership fees.

External links 

 Official website

References 

Greece
Social liberal parties
Pro-European political parties in Greece
Secular parties in Greece
2022 establishments in Greece
Political parties established in 2022